Chikkamalligwad is a village in Dharwad district of Karnataka, India.

Demographics
As of the 2011 Census of India there were 441 households in Chikkamalligwad and a total population of 2,389 consisting of 1,237 males and 1,152 females. There were 351 children ages 0-6.

References

Villages in Dharwad district